The 1869 Renfrewshire by-election was fought on 25 January 1869.  The by-election was fought due to the death of the incumbent Liberal MP Archibald Alexander Speirs.  It was won by the unopposed Liberal candidate Henry Bruce.

References

Politics of Renfrewshire
1869 elections in the United Kingdom
1869 in Scotland
1860s elections in Scotland
By-elections to the Parliament of the United Kingdom in Scottish constituencies
Unopposed by-elections to the Parliament of the United Kingdom in Scottish constituencies
January 1869 events